Md. Sirajul Islam (28 February 1943 – 4 April 2020) was a Bangladesh Awami League politician. He was elected a member of parliament from Sylhet-12 (present Maulvibazar-1) in 1973 and 1979. He was an organizer of the Liberation War of Bangladesh.

Career 
Sirajul Islam was founder and General Secretary of sylhet district chhatra league from 1963–1964

Death 
Sirajul Islam died of COVID-19 on 4 April 2020, while undergoing treatment at Elmhurst Hospital Center in Queens, New York City.

References 

2020 deaths
People from Barlekha Upazila
Awami League politicians
1st Jatiya Sangsad members
2nd Jatiya Sangsad members
Deaths from the COVID-19 pandemic in New York (state)
1943 births